Salmon Lake State Park is a public recreation area located approximately  northeast of Missoula, Montana. The state park occupies  on the eastern side of Salmon Lake in the Clearwater River chain between the Mission and Swan mountain ranges.

History
The Champion Timberlands Corporation donated land for the park in 1977 to commemorate three foresters who died in a plane crash near Kalispell the year before.

Natural features
The lake is surrounded by largely woodland mountains, with ponderosa pine, western larch, and douglas fir being the dominant tree species. Species of fish found in Salmon Lake and the connected waterways include rainbow, cutthroat, brown, brook and bull trout, largemouth bass, white mountain whitefish, kokanee salmon, yellow perch and northern pike. Birds that may be spotted include rednecked grebes, great blue herons, bald eagles, ospreys, common loons, and other species of waterfowl.

Activities and amenities
Park facilities include a swimming area, boat ramp, and campsites.

References

External links
Salmon Lake State Park Montana State Parks
Salmon Lake State Park Map Montana State Parks

Protected areas of Missoula County, Montana
State parks of Montana
Protected areas established in 1977
1977 establishments in Montana